Heron Books is an American K-12 research company, publishing educational materials, learning guides and books for schools, parents and children. Products are distributed internationally through retail and online sales and fairs.

Company structure 
Heron Books is an assumed business name of Delphi Schools Inc. It is a trademark owned by Northwest Research, Inc., which is another assumed business name of Delphi Schools Inc. Heron Books has its headquarters on the property of The Delphian School in unincorporated Yamhill County, Oregon, near Sheridan.

Several of Heron Book's published works for students are based on the teachings of American author, L. Ron Hubbard. The Heron Basics Program is listed on the website of the Delphi Academy as their basis of instruction.

Two other publishers have been called Heron Books, both based in London. One published faux-leather classics in the late 1960s and early 1970s, while the other published new fiction and nonfiction as an imprint of Quercus from 2011 to 2016.

References

External links 

 Heron Books official site

Yamhill County, Oregon